Daniël Robin Frederick de Ridder (born 6 March 1984) is a Dutch  former professional footballer. He played as a winger operating either on the right or left side but would occasionally play a more advanced role. He represented Ajax, Celta Vigo, Birmingham City, Wigan Athletic, Hapoel Tel Aviv, Grasshopper, Heerenveen, RKC Waalwijk and Cambuur.

Since 2016, De Ridder has worked as a pundit for football program NOS Eredivisie op Vrijdag.

Early and personal life
De Ridder was born in Amsterdam to a Dutch father and a Jewish-Israeli mother. He is Jewish and speaks Hebrew.

Club career

Ajax
He worked his way up to first-team selection from Ajax's youth department, making his full debut in an away game against Roda JC on 21 January 2004, and scored his first goal against Willem II on 16 May.

De Ridder was a regular throughout the second half of the campaign, starting nine games and appearing a further six times as a substitute. De Ridder made his UEFA Champions League debut in September 2004, coming on as a 69th-minute substitute in a 4–0 defeat at Bayern Munich. In December 2004, he was offered an improved contract until June 2007.

Part of the Netherlands side that reached the second qualifying round of the UEFA European Under-19 Championship in 2002–03, De Ridder stepped up to the U21s as the 2006 UEFA European Championship qualifying campaign kicked off.

De Ridder was told prior to the 2005–2006 season that there would be no room for him in the squad and he could expect little playing time if he decided to stay.

Celta Vigo
De Ridder joined Celta de Vigo permanently on 31 August 2005.

On 25 September 2005, De Ridder made his official debut for Celta when they beat Sevilla, allowing the Galician club to temporarily top La Liga. On 3 April 2006, De Ridder scored his first official goal for Celta against Atlético Madrid. Throughout the second half of the campaign he was a regular for Celta, but they were relegated to the Segunda División at the end of the 2006–07 season.

Birmingham City
De Ridder signed for Birmingham City on a free transfer on 3 July 2007. He made his Premier League debut on 12 August 2007 as a substitute in the opening match of the season against Chelsea, but injured his ankle within minutes of coming on and was unable to complete the match. Though starting the League Cup defeat at Blackburn Rovers, he was not considered fit enough for League games until after the October international break, when he made a substitute appearance against Manchester City. He was a key player in Birmingham's 3–2 win against Wigan Athletic on 27 October 2007 in which he made his full home debut. De Ridder's last game for the club was in January 2008 in the FA Cup, manager Alex McLeish considering him better suited to a style of play which placed more emphasis on passing than did Birmingham's. His contract was cancelled by mutual consent at the end of the season.

Wigan Athletic
He joined Wigan Athletic the next day on a free transfer and signed a three-year deal. De Ridder got his first assist against Newcastle United coming off the bench and swinging in an 89th-minute corner for a dramatic Titus Bramble equalizer. He was released by Wigan at the end of the 2010–11 season.

Loan to Hapoel Tel Aviv 
De Ridder moved to Israel and signed for Hapoel Tel Aviv on loan until the end of the season on 20 January 2010 after failing to make an appearance for Wigan Athletic in the 2009–10 season. Hapoel Tel Aviv were surprised to learn that De Ridder did not have an Israeli passport since the age of 3 and would have to register him as a foreigner. The club then approached the Interior Ministry to check what allowances could be made to register De Ridder as an Israeli since he is Jewish. During his time with Hapoel, De Ridder scored a crucial goal against Bnei Yehuda Tel Aviv F.C. in the 46th minute (which won the game for Hapoel). He also scored the third goal against F.C. Ashdod, a game which Hapoel won 4–0. He won the Israeli Cup and the Israeli Championship with Hapoel Tel Aviv in 2010.

Grasshopper Club Zürich
On 9 July 2011, De Ridder signed a two-year contract with Grasshopper Club Zürich. Through his first 11 games for the club, De Ridder assisted two Swiss Super League goals.

International career
Ever-present in the qualification games of the Netherlands U-21 team along with Klaas-Jan Huntelaar, De Ridder entered the finals as the most experienced member of the Netherlands' U-21 squad with 18 caps. He scored the decisive goal in the match against Italy which ensured qualification for the semifinals. The Netherlands went on to win the UEFA U-21 Championship 2006.

In 2007 De Ridder was called up by Jong Oranje coach Foppe de Haan to be part of his squad for the 2007 UEFA European Under-21 Football Championship held in the Netherlands. De Ridder participated in their first round group match against Israel (1–0 win) and after the match against Portugal (2–1 win) they secured a semifinal spot and qualification for the 2008 Summer Olympics. In the semifinals against England (1–1, 13–12 after 32 penalty kicks) De Ridder scored and missed one of the penalty kicks. In the final against Serbia (4–1), De Ridder provided the pass from which Otman Bakkal made it 1–0. In the second half De Ridder created the opportunity for Ryan Babel to put the Netherlands 2–0 up, and in the 87th minute Luigi Bruins scored a tap-in from a De Ridder move to make it 4–1. The Netherlands won the UEFA U-21 Championship 2007.

Honours
Ajax
Eredivisie: 2003–04
Dutch Super Cup: 2005

Hapoel Tel Aviv
Israeli Premier League: 2009–10
Israel State Cup: 2010

Netherlands U21
UEFA European Under-21 Championship: 2006, 2007

Individual
Talent of the Year (NOS Award): 2004

See also
List of select Jewish football (association; soccer) players

References

External links
 Voetbal International profile 
 
 

1984 births
Living people
Dutch footballers
Netherlands under-21 international footballers
AFC Ajax players
RC Celta de Vigo players
De Ridder, Daniel
De Ridder, Daniel
Hapoel Tel Aviv F.C. players
Grasshopper Club Zürich players
SC Heerenveen players
RKC Waalwijk players
SC Cambuur players
Eredivisie players
La Liga players
Premier League players
Israeli Premier League players
Jewish Dutch sportspeople
Dutch Jews
Dutch expatriate footballers
De Ridder, Daniel
Expatriate footballers in Spain
Expatriate footballers in Switzerland
Footballers from Amsterdam
Dutch people of Israeli descent
Dutch expatriate sportspeople in Spain
Dutch expatriate sportspeople in Switzerland
Association football wingers
Jewish footballers